Shubhangi Atre (born 11 April 1981) is an Indian television actress. Atre debuted in acting with Ekta Kapoor's Kasautii Zindagii Kay where she played Palchinn Basu. She went on to earn numerous recognition and awards success for starring as the titular lead, Kasturi, in Kapoor's Kasturi (2007–09), Preeti in the Indian Drama serial Do Hanson Ka Jodaa (2009-2010) and Angoori Tiwari in the Hindi sitcom Bhabiji Ghar Par Hain! (2016–present), that ranks among the longest running Indian comedy sitcoms.

Early life
Atre was born on 11 April 1981. She hails from Indore and has an MBA degree (Master of Business Administration).

Career
Before coming to the TV industry, Atre shot for a shampoo brand (regional product). It was an ad for print.

After marriage, she started her acting career in 2006, when producer Ekta Kapoor gave her a role  in Kasautii Zindagii Kay. She was then seen in a lead role in Kasturi. After that, she played a negative character in Havan. In 2013, Atre replaced Shilpa Shinde in popular sitcom Chidiya Ghar. Coincidentally, she again replaced her three years later, in April 2016, as Angoori Tiwari in the show  Bhabiji Ghar Par Hain! on &TV. The same year, she also portrayed the role of Devsena in Adhuri Kahaani Hamari on &TV. Eventually, she became a household name from Bhabiji Ghar Par Hai!. 

Shilpa Shinde, who was playing the character of Angoori, made an allegation that Atre was copying  her. To clarify this, Atre said that she was adopting the mannerisms of Angoori, and was not copying Shinde.  Atre also said: 
 After Chidiyaghar, Atre replaced Shinde for the second time in her career.

About picking the offer to do comedy serial Bhabiji Ghar Par Hain!, Atre said: 

Atre received mixed reviews from audiences for portraying "Angoori". The Times of India praised Shubhangi Atre as 'Angoori Bhabi' by saying that she is doing a fantastic work.

Personal life
Atre married Peeyush Poorey in 2003, with whom she has a daughter. In 2022 Atre separated from her husband due to some differences.
She is a music lover. She is a fan of Salman Khan.

Atre's catchphrase "Sahi Pakade Hain" (You Caught It Right) from her serial Bhabi Ji Ghar Par Hai! became popular. About the catchphrase, Atre said that:

Filmography

Films

Television

Awards and nominations

See also
 List of Hindi television actresses

References

External links

 

1981 births
Living people
Indian television actresses
Actresses from Indore
Indian film actresses
Actresses in Hindi television
21st-century Indian actresses